Francis is an English surname of Latin origin. Notable people with the surname include:

Alun Francis (born 1943), Welsh conductor
Anne Francis (1930–2011), was an American actress
Arlene Francis (1907–2001), American actress
Armet Francis (born 1945), Jamaican-born photographer based in London
Barrington Francis (born 1965), Jamaican/Canadian boxer of the 1980s and 1990s
Black Francis (born 1965), American musician
Bowden Francis (born 1996), American baseball player
Camden Francis (born 2003), American philanthropist & public speaker
Clare Francis (born 1946), British author
Claudius Francis (born 1959), Saint Lucian politician
Connie Francis (born 1938), American pop singer
David Rowland Francis (1850–1927), American politician, Mayor of Saint Louis, Governor of Missouri, U.S. Secretary of the Interior
Damien Francis, (born 1979), English-born Jamaican footballer
Danusia Francis, (born 1994), British gymnast
David Francis (disambiguation)
Dick Francis (1920–2010), British jockey-turned-novelist
Dillon Francis, (born 1987), American electronic musician and disc jockey
Eddie Francis, (born 1974), Canadian politician
Felix Francis, (born 1953), British author
Freddie Francis (1917–2007), English cinematographer and film director
Jacobi Francis (born 1998), American football player
Jane Francis (born 1956), Winner of Polar Medal, 2002
Genie Francis (born 1962), Actress
Gerry Francis (born 1951), English footballer and manager
James Francis (1819–1884), Australian colonial politician
Jeff Francis (born 1951), Major League Baseball pitcher
Joseph Francis (disambiguation), several people named Joe or Joseph Francis
Kay Francis (1905–1968), American actress
Kevin Francis (disambiguation), several people named Kevin Francis
K. T. Francis (1939–2013), Sri Lankan cricket umpire
Leigh Francis (born 1974), British comedian
Leslie Francis, American philosopher
Mark Francis (disambiguation)
Mary Francis, British businesswoman
Mary Margaret Francis, British author
Melissa Francis (born 1972), American television journalist and former child actress
Michael Kpakala Francis (1936–2013), Liberian Roman Catholic archbishop
Nellie Griswold Francis (1874–1969), American civil rights activist
Noel Francis (1906–1959), American actress of the stage and screen 
Norman Francis (born 1931), President of Xavier University of Louisiana
Pam Francis (1954–2020), American photographer
Percy Francis (footballer) (1875–1947), English footballer
Ranganathan Francis (1920–1975), Indian hockey player
Robert Francis (barrister) (born 1950), British barrister specialising in medical law
Ron Francis (born 1963), Canadian professional ice hockey centerman
Roy Francis (c. 1919–1989), British rugby league footballer and coach
Russ Francis (born 1953), American football player, tight end, New England Patriots and San Francisco 49ers
Sage Francis (born 1977), hip-hop artist
Sam Francis, (1923–1994), American painter and printmaker
Sam Francis (1913–2002), American football player
Samuel Kensinger Francis (born 1974), fitness trainer
Samuel T. Francis (1947–2005), American columnist
Steve Francis (born 1977), American professional basketball player
Thomas Francis, Jr. (1900–1969), American physician, virologist, and epidemiologist
Trevor Francis (born 1954), English footballer
William T. Francis (1870–1929), United States diplomat

See also
Francis (given name)
Francis (disambiguation)

English-language surnames